The Canon de 138 mm Modèle 1927 was a medium-calibre gun of the French Navy used during World War II. It was derived from a German World War I design. It was used on the destroyers of the Aigle and Vauquelin classes and the Bougainville-class sloops.

Description
The 40-calibre Mle 1927 was derived from the German World War I 15 cm L/45 UToF gun as mounted on the large torpedo boat SMS S113 received by France as war reparations. It copied the German gun's semi-automatic action and its horizontal sliding-block breech. It had an autofretted, monobloc barrel.

Mounting
The gun had a firing cycle of 4 or 5 seconds with its automatic spring rammer, but the dredger hoists transporting the shells and cartridge cases slowed the rate of fire down to 8-10 rounds per minute.

Notes

References 
 Campbell, John. Naval Weapons of World War Two. London: Conway Maritime Press, 2002

External links 

 PIECES MOYENNES : 120 à 239
 French 138.6 mm/40 (5.46") Model 1927

World War II naval weapons
Naval guns of France
138 mm artillery
Military equipment introduced in the 1920s